Iwaki Station may refer to:
 Iwaki Station (Fukushima)
 Iwaki Station (Nara)